The WWA World Tag Team Championship (Campeonato Mundial de Parejas WWA in Spanish) is a Mexican professional wrestling Tag Team championship promoted by the Mexican Lucha Libre wrestling based promotion World Wrestling Association (WWA) since 1991. 

As it was a professional wrestling championship, the championship was not won not by actual competition, but by a scripted ending to a match determined by the bookers and match makers. On occasion the promotion declares a championship vacant, which means there is no champion at that point in time. This can either be due to a storyline, or real life issues such as a champion suffering an injury being unable to defend the championship, or leaving the company.

It was first won by Silver King and El Texano in a championship tournament held in May 1991. The current champions are Bestia 666 and Damián 666.

Title history

Footnotes

References

External links
W.W.A. World Tag Team Title
WWA World Tag Team Title

Tag team wrestling championships
World Wrestling Association (Mexico) Championships